Irvine Geale Robertson (July 10, 1882 – February 26, 1956) was a Canadian rower who competed in the 1908 Summer Olympics. He was a bowman of the Canadian boat, which won the bronze medal in the men's eight.

References

External links
Irvine Robertson's profile at databaseOlympics

1882 births
1956 deaths
Canadian male rowers
Olympic rowers of Canada
Rowers at the 1908 Summer Olympics
Olympic bronze medalists for Canada
Olympic medalists in rowing
Medalists at the 1908 Summer Olympics